Jakob Hlasek and Marc Rosset were the defending champions, but Rosset did not participate this year.  Hlasek partnered Michiel Schapers, losing in the first round.

Gary Muller and Danie Visser won the title, defeating John-Laffnie De Jager and Stefan Kruger 6–3, 7–6 in the final.

Seeds

  Tom Nijssen /  Cyril Suk (quarterfinals)
  David Adams /  Andrei Olhovskiy (first round)
  Gary Muller /  Danie Visser (champions)
  Steve DeVries /  David Macpherson (first round)

Draw

Draw

External links
Draw

1993 ATP Tour